Trinacria   may  refer to:
the ancient Name of Sicily
Sicily in the classical Greek period, see History of Greek and Hellenistic Sicily
Name for the Kingdom of Sicily during the 1300s
Name for the emblem of Sicily (the triskeles with the Gorgoneion Medusa), see Triskelion#Sicily
A nickname of the modern Flag of Sicily
Trinacria (bivalve), a genus of bivalves in the family Noetiidae
Trinacria (diatom), a genus of diatoms
Trinacria, a noise/death metal band which is a side project for members of Enslaved

See also
Three valli of Sicily
Three-finger salute (Sicilian)
Thrinacia, the Homeric island of Helios' cattle